Más allá del puente, is a Mexican telenovela produced by Carla Estrada for Televisa in 1993. It is a sequel of the telenovela, De frente al sol produced in 1992.

María Sorté and Alfredo Adame star as the main protagonists.

Cast 
María Sorté as Alicia Sandoval
Alfredo Adame as Eduardo
Angélica Aragón as Chole
Katy Jurado as La Jurada
Susana Alexander as Leonor
Lilia Aragón as Rosaura
Ada Carrasco as Lich
Amairani as Lupita (replaced Itati Cantoral)
Socorro Avelar as Serafina
Juan Manuel Bernal as Chinino
Irán Castillo as Irán
Fernando Colunga as Valerio
Miguel Córcega as Hernán
Eric del Castillo as Daniel
Carlos Girón as Carlos
Sergio Kleiner as Adrián
Ana Bertha Espín as Señora Resendiz
Omar Fierro as Felipe
Mónica Miguel as Amaranta
René Muñoz as Quijano
Arcelia Ramírez as Carolina
Eduardo Santamarina as Luis Enrique
Felicia Mercado as Sara
Patricia Navidad as Rosalía
Jorge Russek as Don Fulgencio
Mauricio Achar as Alex
Lupita Lara as Úrsula
Isabel Andrade as Eulalia
Raúl Askenazi as Joel
José Carlos Ruiz as Angel

References

External links 

1993 telenovelas
1993 Mexican television series debuts
1994 Mexican television series endings
Mexican telenovelas
Televisa telenovelas
Spanish-language telenovelas